Myarth is a hill in the Usk Valley in the county of Powys in South Wales, about 2 miles west of Crickhowell. It is listed as a Marilyn. Myarth has an elongate form commonly ascribed to erosion by the west-to-east movement of the Usk Valley glacier during successive ice ages. The River Usk runs along the foot of the hill on its southern side. Myarth forms a prominent feature in many views over the Usk Valley and often features in commercial photography of the area.

Though it is ringed by public roads—the A40 to the north and a minor road to the south—there is no public access to the hill itself, which is in private ownership.

In 2016, the hill was used as the location for a segment of an episode of the motoring series The Grand Tour.

References

Black Mountains, Wales
Mountains and hills of Powys
Marilyns of Wales